Bobby Sox Idol is a calypso song by Trinidadian musician Wilmoth Houdini about singer Frank Sinatra.

Background
Having elements of comedy music, Bobby Sox Idol is about American singer Frank Sinatra where, in the song, Houdini encourages Sinatra to sing calypso music because his voice is suited for it:

Ah Frankie Sinatra
Ah Frank Sinatra,
Frankie me boy you don't know
You have a perfect voice to sing Calypso

The song's name Bobby Sox Idol represents Frank Sinatra – The term "Bobby Sox" is derived from Bobby soxer, a neologism used for the zealous, teenage female fans of Sinatra.

Composition
It is set in common time and has a moderate tempo of 82 beats per minute. It is written in the key of C Minor.

Pop culture
The song references The Andrews Sisters, Bing Crosby and Little Jimmy Dickens.

The song is sampled in Frankie Sinatra (2016) by The Avalanches.

Track listings
The song is found in the albums The Calypso Way (1940) and Rum and Coca-Cola (1947).

References

Songs about Frank Sinatra
Songs about teenagers
1947 singles
1947 songs
Calypso songs